Forward Communist Party (Joglekar) was a political party in India. FCP(J) was formed in 1952 following a split in the Forward Communist Party. The group was led by K.N. Joglekar. In the same year as that split, FCP(J) merged with the Communist Party of India.

Sources

Defunct communist parties in India
Political parties established in 1952
1952 establishments in India
Political parties with year of disestablishment missing